The Q is a Hindi language youth-centric entertainment channel owned by QYou Media. This channel shows some content from digital platforms like YouTube and MX Player.

Programming

Original shows
Mr Aur Mrs LLB
Dil se connection

Animated stories
 Anokhi Kahaniyaan
 Daravani Kahaniyaan
 Dilchasp Kahaniyaan
 Gazab Kahaniyaan
 Kisso Ka Khazana
 Shiny Aur Shasha
 Khooni Mondays

Animated comedy shows
 Nattu

Comedy shows
 Baklol
 Elvish Yadav
 Sweety Special
 Faridabad Rockers
 Ridhu Pidhu
 Ankush Kasana
 This Is Sumesh
 Yo Yo Yogesh
 Hasi Ka HAHAkaar
 Ulat Pulat

Chuski Zindagi Ki
Badhiya hai
Dhaakad codies
Pagalpanti

Upcoming Shows
Doramon
Sinchane
Motu Patlu
DTH Updates (DTH Talk)
Pathan
Chota Bheem
Zee Cine Award
Kapil Shrma Show

Former shows

Original show
 Jurm Ka Chehra

Others
 Chu Chu Ke Fans
 Food For Foodies
 Seema's Smart Kitchen
 Aashram
 Prank By UngliBaaz
 Total Indian Drama
 Aastik Ek Viswas
 Lit Cook Off
 Kanak's Kitchen
 Curly tales food

Animated shows
 Akbar Birbal
 Mahabharat
 Ramayan
 Divya Kathayein
 Maskhari

References

External links 
 Official facebook page of TheQ

Hindi-language television channels in India
Television channels and stations established in 2017
Hindi-language television stations